Le sens de la vie is the French equivalent of Meaning of life, the concept concerning the possible purpose and significance that may be attributed to human existence and one's personal life.

Le sens de la vie may also refer to:

"Le sens de la vie", a 2012 single by French singer Tal
Le sens de la vie, 1889 novel by French-Belgian novelist Edouard Rod
Le sens de la vie, 1968 work by Belgian writer Marcel Lecomte
Le sens de la vie, 1994 novel by French actress and talk show host Brigitte Lahaie
Le sens de la vie, a 2008 book in the comics series Titeuf by Zep
Monty Python: Le sens de la vie, the French language title of Monty Python's The Meaning of Life

See also
Meaning of life (disambiguation)